The S-IC (pronounced S-one-C) was the first stage of the American Saturn V rocket. The S-IC stage was manufactured by the Boeing Company. The stage provided  of thrust at sea level to get the rocket through the first  of ascent. The stage had five F-1 engines in a quincunx arrangement. The center engine was fixed in position, while the four outer engines could be hydraulically gimballed to control the rocket.

Manufacturing
The Boeing Co. was awarded the contract to manufacture the S-IC on December 15, 1961. By this time the general design of the stage had been decided on by the engineers at the Marshall Space Flight Center (MSFC). The main place of manufacture was the Michoud Assembly Facility, New Orleans. Wind tunnel testing took place in Seattle and the machining of the tools needed to build the stages at Wichita, Kansas.

MSFC built the first three test stages (S-IC-T, the S-IC-S, and the S-IC-F) and the first two flight models (S-IC-1 and -2).

It took roughly seven to nine months to build the tanks and 14 months to complete a stage. The first stage built by Boeing was S-IC-D, a test model.

In addition to the four test stages, NASA ordered 15 flight stages (S-IC-1 through -15) to support the initial Apollo program. In July 1967, NASA awarded Boeing a contract to begin long-lead-time item acquisition (such as propellant lines and tank components) for the 16th and 17th S-IC stages. A full contract for the construction of S-IC-16 to S-IC-25 was drafted throughout mid-1967, but stages past S-IC-15 were canceled altogether in October of that year due to budgetary restrictions. S-IC-16 to -25 would have been utilized for follow-on Apollo missions, including those from the Apollo Applications Program.

Design
The S-IC was composed of five major subsections.

It was designed to support the thrust of the five engines and redistribute it evenly across the base of the rocket. There were four anchors which held down the rocket as it built thrust.

The five F-1 engines were ignited in 3 staggered events, where the center engine was first ignited, followed by two outer engines, and then the remaining two outer engines. These three ignition events were separated by just 300 milliseconds. This staggered ignition approach lessened the loads on the thrust structure, as an instantaneous ignition of all five engines would impart immense stress on the stage.

Above the thrust structure was the fuel tank, containing  of RP-1 fuel. The tank itself had a mass of over  dry and could release . Nitrogen was bubbled through the tank before launch to keep the fuel mixed. During the flight the fuel was pressurized using helium, which was stored in tanks in the liquid oxygen tank above. Both the thrust structure and fuel tank had alternating black and white paint, in order to monitor the vehicle's roll during flight.

Between the fuel and liquid oxygen tanks was the intertank. This contained propellant fill and drain lines for the liquid oxygen tank as well as a portion of the five liquid oxygen feed lines for the engines.

The liquid oxygen tank held  of LOX. It raised special issues for the designer. The lines through which the LOX ran to the engine had to be straight (as any bend would slow the flow of LOX, which would necessitate even larger and heavier piping) and therefore had to pass through the fuel tank. This meant insulating these lines inside a tunnel to stop fuel freezing to the outside and also meant adding five extra holes in the top of the fuel tank.

Atop the liquid oxygen tank sat the forward skirt, which connected the S-IC to the S-II stage and contained telemetry equipment and LOX tank vent lines.

Two solid motor retrorockets were located inside each of the four conical engine fairings. At separation of the S-IC from the flight vehicle, the eight retrorockets fired, blowing off removable sections of the fairings forward of the fins, and backing the S-IC away from the flight vehicle as the engines on the S-II stage were ignited.

The propellant tanks of the S-IC were manufactured from 2219-series aluminum panels, while the interstage, forward skirt, and thrust structure were built from 7075-series aluminum. The latter three sections also were corrugated with external stringers, providing additional structural support. The propellant tanks did not feature external stringers, as the tank pressurization provided sufficient rigidity.

The S-IC also carried the ODOP transponder to track the flight after takeoff.

Stages built

See also
 S-II
 S-IVB
Apollo (spacecraft)

References

External links

 Stages to Saturn
 Apollo Saturn Reference Page

Apollo program
Rocket stages